Noel Kaseke (born December 24, 1980 in Bulawayo, Zimbabwe) is a Zimbabwean football midfielder. He currently plays as a defensive midfielder.

Kaseke grew up in Dete and attended secondary school at Marist Brothers Dete.

Kaseke started his senior footballing career in the Highlanders FC in 1999. Three years later he moved for the first time to Europe, and joined the KF Erzeni Shijak in Albania. Then he returned to Highlanders FC for six months. He also played in Mohun Bagan AC in India. His next club was Enosis Neon Paralimni where he stayed for three years. In June 2007 he signed a contract with AC Omonia. He plays best as a defensive midfielder but he also plays well as a right back. In May 2012 his contract with AC Omonia end, so Kaseke was free to find his new team. During this five years with AC Omonia Kaseke won 5 titles.

Honours
Omonia
Cypriot Championship: 2010
Cypriot Cup: 2011, 2012
Cyprus FA Shield: 2010

External links
 

1980 births
Living people
Sportspeople from Bulawayo
Zimbabwean footballers
Zimbabwe international footballers
Zimbabwean expatriate footballers
AC Omonia players
Alki Larnaca FC players
Enosis Neon Paralimni FC players
Al-Shaab CSC players
Dibba Al-Hisn Sports Club players
Masfout Club players
Cypriot First Division players
Expatriate footballers in Cyprus
Expatriate footballers in Albania
Expatriate footballers in the United Arab Emirates
Highlanders F.C. players
UAE First Division League players
UAE Pro League players
Association football midfielders